The Berlin Process is an intergovernmental cooperation initiative linked to the future enlargement of the European Union. It started with the 2014 Berlin Conference, which was followed by the 2015 Vienna Summit, the 2016 Paris Summit, the 2017 Trieste Summit, the 2018 London Summit and the 2019 Poznań Summit. The Berlin Process was initiated in order to consolidate and maintain the dynamics of the EU integration process in light of increased euroscepticism and the five-year moratorium on enlargement announced by Commission President Jean Claude Juncker.

The Berlin Process is aimed at revitalizing the multilateral ties between EU candidate and potential candidate countries of the former Yugoslavia and Albania and selected EU member states, and at improving regional cooperation in those countries on the issues of infrastructure and economic development. It is one of the flagship diplomatic initiatives on South-east Europe of the third Merkel cabinet. It is complemented by initiatives relating to specific South-east European countries (e.g., the German-British diplomatic initiative for Bosnia and Herzegovina's EU accession).

The initiative includes five non-EU Balkan candidates for EU membership (Montenegro, Serbia, North Macedonia, Bosnia and Herzegovina, Albania) and a non-EU Balkan potential candidate ( Kosovo), some EU members, i.e.: Austria, Bulgaria, Croatia, France, Greece, Germany, Italy, Poland, and Slovenia and one additional country, the United Kingdom.

See also 
 2014 Conference of Western Balkan States, Berlin 
 2015 Western Balkans Summit, Vienna
 2016 Western Balkans Summit, Paris
 2017 Western Balkans Summit, Trieste
 2018 Western Balkans Summit, London
 2019 Western Balkans Summit, Poznań
 Future enlargement of the European Union
Accession of Albania to the European Union
Accession of Bosnia and Herzegovina to the European Union
Accession of Kosovo to the European Union
Accession of North Macedonia to the European Union
Accession of Montenegro to the European Union
Accession of Serbia to the European Union
 Belgrade–Pristina negotiations
 Southeast Europe Transport Community

Notes

References

External links 

 Berlin Process website

21st-century diplomatic conferences (Europe)
Southeastern Europe
Contemplated enlargements of the European Union